The Guadalajara International Film Festival is a week-long film festival held each March in the Mexican city of Guadalajara since 1986.

The presence in Guadalajara of delegates from other important festivals from around the world has helped Mexican cinema to have a strong international presence in the last twenty years. The festival has also helped to revitalize the careers of some older more established Mexican and English speaking artists like Arturo Ripstein, Gabriel Figueroa, María Félix, Jaime Humberto Hermosillo, Silvia Pinal, Ignacio López Tarso, Ana Ofelia Murguía, Felipe Cazals, Jorge Fons, Katy Jurado, and Ismael Rodríguez as well as many others.

The festival features an official competition, similar to other festivals like Cannes, and an international jury presents awards in several category at the end of each festival, many of which are accompanied by cash prizes.

Activities

Guadalajara Film Market & Producers Network (Marché du Film, Festival de Cannes)
Iberoamerican Film Market
Short Up!!! (Short Film Program)
Digital Space (Digital Cinema Keynotes)
Iberoamerican Co-production Meeting
Guadalajara Build (Post-production Market)
Expotec (Technology Show)
Iberoamerican Film Crossing Borders (Foreign Market Training)

Gallery

See also
 Film festivals in North and Central America

References

External links

 Official website

1968 establishments in Mexico
Film festivals in Mexico
Spring (season) events in Mexico
Film festival